Evelyn Lucella Miller (born 3 January 1952) is a New Zealand former cricketer who played as a right-handed batter. She appeared in three Test matches for New Zealand in 1979. She played domestic cricket for North Shore.

References

External links

1952 births
Living people
Cricketers from Auckland
New Zealand women cricketers
New Zealand women Test cricketers
North Shore women cricketers